Six Gun Man is a 1946 American Western film written and directed by Harry L. Fraser. The film stars Bob Steele, Syd Saylor, Jimmy Martin, Jean Carlin, I. Stanford Jolley, Brooke Temple, Bud Osborne and Budd Buster. The film was released on February 1, 1946, by Producers Releasing Corporation.

Plot

Cast          
Bob Steele as Bob 'Stormy' Storm
Syd Saylor as Syd 'Rawhide' McTavish
Jimmy Martin as Tim Hager 
Jean Carlin as Laura Barton
I. Stanford Jolley as Matt Haley
Brooke Temple as Ed Slater
Bud Osborne as Sam Elkins
Budd Buster as Joe Turner
Stanley Blystone as Lon Kelly
Roy Brent as Slim Peters
Steve Clark as Sheriff Jennings
Dorothy Whitmore as Mrs. Barton

References

External links
 

1946 films
1940s English-language films
American Western (genre) films
1946 Western (genre) films
Producers Releasing Corporation films
Films directed by Harry L. Fraser
American black-and-white films
Films with screenplays by Harry L. Fraser
1940s American films